Andrei Vladimirovich Chekunov (born 7 September 1966) is a Russian professional football official and a former player.

Club career
He made his professional debut in the Soviet Top League in 1986 for FC Dinamo Tbilisi.

References

1966 births
People from Gagra
Living people
Soviet footballers
Russian footballers
Soviet Top League players
Russian Premier League players
FC Dinamo Tbilisi players
FC Dinamo Sukhumi players
FC Zhemchuzhina Sochi players
FC Volgar Astrakhan players
Association football defenders
FC Novokuznetsk players